They're moving Father's grave to build a sewer is a classic music hall song. The origin seems to be unknown but was revived by the Clancy Brothers. It was a favourite, well before the Brothers' time, of Frank Muir, who sang it many times on BBC Radio 4. It is usually sung in a straight key of C major, but can be varied.

Lyrics
Lyrics vary, but Muir's version is thus:

Recorded versions 

A variant of the song, called "Grandpa's Grave", was recorded by the comedian Peter Sellers and included on his 1960 LP with Sophia Loren, Peter & Sophia, as well as on the B-side of the duo's hit single "Goodness Gracious Me".

A version of the song was also recorded by Oscar Brand, on his album Bawdy Songs Goes to College recorded in 1955, under the title "Father's Grave".

References

Year of song unknown
Music hall songs
Songs about fathers
Songs about death
Songwriter unknown